Donald Ray Mincher (June 24, 1938 – March 4, 2012) was an American Major League Baseball first baseman and longtime minor league executive. He played in the majors from 1960–1972 for the "original" Washington Senators and Minnesota Twins, California Angels, Seattle Pilots, Oakland Athletics, and the expansion Washington Senators and Texas Rangers, all of the American League. He was a member of the last editions of each of Washington's two 20th Century American League teams and their first-year squads in their new locales, Minneapolis–Saint Paul and Dallas–Fort Worth.

Career

Major league player
Mincher's professional baseball career began when he signed with the Chicago White Sox after graduating from Huntsville's S. R. Butler High School in 1956. He steadily rose through the Chicago system for four years, but was traded to Washington on the eve of the  season, along with young catcher Earl Battey, for veteran Senators' slugger Roy Sievers. Mincher also appeared in all seven games of the 1965 World Series. Although he  collected only three hits in 23 at bats (.130), his first hit was a home run off Don Drysdale in the second inning of Game 1. It scored Minnesota's first run of the Fall Classic. The Twins won that contest, 8–2, but Drysdale's Los Angeles Dodgers would ultimately prevail in seven games.

Mincher belted more than 20 homers five times in his first seven years as an everyday player. All told, over all or parts of 13 MLB seasons, Mincher batted .249, with 1,003 hits, 176 doubles, 16 triples and 200 home runs and 643 runs batted in (RBI) in 1,400 career games. He was elected to the American League All-Star team twice ( and ). As one of two representatives for the Seattle Pilots in 1969 (their only season in existence before becoming the Milwaukee Brewers), he also holds the distinction of being the only player to ever play in an All-Star Game as a Pilot; Mike Hegan also was selected to the team as a reserve, but did not appear in the game. The following season, Mincher batted .246 and slugged a career-high 27 homers while driving in 74 runs in 140 games as a member of the  Oakland Athletics. His playing career ended after the  season, which saw the 34-year-old Mincher hit only .148 with 5 RBI in 47 games, mostly as a pinch hitter, after Oakland reacquired him from the Rangers on July 26. But in the 1972 World Series, Mincher's ninth-inning pinch single in Game 4 off Clay Carroll drove home the tying run, as the Athletics came from behind to defeat the Cincinnati Reds, 3–2. Mincher's name appeared in the box scores of two other games, but he never officially batted in either contest when he was replaced by a right-handed pinch hitter. Oakland defeated Cincinnati in seven games, earning Mincher a World Series championship ring.

Minor league executive
Mincher served as the first president and general manager of the Huntsville Stars, the Double-A affiliate of the Oakland A's (1985–1998) and, later, the Milwaukee Brewers (1999–2014). He served in this role from 1985 until 2001. In 1994, Mincher and a group of local investors purchased the team from Larry Schmittou to keep baseball in Huntsville.

In 2000, Mincher was named interim president of the Southern League, where the Stars play, when league president Arnold Fielkow left for an executive position with the New Orleans Saints of the National Football League.  Mincher resigned from his position with the Stars when his group sold the team to Miles Prentice in early 2001. This cleared the way for the Southern League to remove the interim tag and they made him league president beginning with the 2001 season. He served as league president until retiring in October 2011, at which point the league named him President-Emeritus.

Mincher was elected to the Alabama Sports Hall of Fame in 2008. Though he never played for the team, the Huntsville Stars retired his number 5 in an on-field ceremony on June 6, 2008. In 2010, he was presented with the King of Baseball award given by Minor League Baseball.

Mincher died after a long illness on March 4, 2012.

Records and achievements
On June 9, 1966, in the seventh inning of a game against the Kansas City Athletics, Mincher was one of five Twins players to hit home runs. The others were Harmon Killebrew, Tony Oliva, Rich Rollins and Zoilo Versalles. These five home runs still stand as a Major League record for the most home runs in a single inning, and were hit off starter Catfish Hunter (two), reliever Paul Lindblad (two), and reliever John Wyatt.

Mincher was one of only 21 players to hit a home run completely over the right-field roof and out of Tiger Stadium in Detroit during the 64-year history of its final configuration. He accomplished the feat on August 23, 1964, as a member of the Minnesota Twins.

References

External links

Retrosheet
Huntsville Stars official website
Southern League official website

1938 births
2012 deaths
American League All-Stars
American members of the Churches of Christ
Baseball players from Alabama
Buffalo Bisons (minor league) players
California Angels players
Charleston ChaSox players
Charleston Senators players
Davenport DavSox players
Duluth-Superior White Sox players
Major League Baseball first basemen
Minnesota Twins players
Minor league baseball executives
Oakland Athletics players
Seattle Pilots players
Sportspeople from Huntsville, Alabama
Texas Rangers players
Washington Senators (1901–1960) players
Washington Senators (1961–1971) players
American expatriate baseball players in Nicaragua